The 2014–15 Montana Grizzlies basketball team represented the University of Montana during the 2014–15 NCAA Division I men's basketball season. The Grizzlies, led by first-year head coach Travis DeCuire, played their home games at Dahlberg Arena and were members of the Big Sky Conference. They finished the season 20–13, 14–4 in Big Sky play to finish in a share for the Big Sky regular season championship. They advanced to the championship game of the Big Sky tournament where they lost to Eastern Washington. As a regular season conference champions and #1 overall seed in their conference tournament, they received an automatic bid to the National Invitation Tournament where they lost in the first round to Texas A&M.

Roster

Schedule

|-
!colspan=9 style="background:#660033; color:#848482;"| Exhibition

|-
!colspan=9 style="background:#660033; color:#848482;"| Regular season

|-
!colspan=9 style="background:#660033; color:#848482;"| Big Sky tournament

|-
!colspan=9 style="background:#660033; color:#848482;"| NIT

See also
2014–15 Montana Lady Griz basketball team

References

Montana Grizzlies basketball seasons
Montana
Montana
Montana Grizzlies basketball
Montana Grizzlies basketball